Inquisitor hormophorus is a species of sea snail, a marine gastropod mollusk in the family Pseudomelatomidae, the turrids and allies.

Description

Distribution
This marine species occurs off the Norfolk Ridge, New Caledonia

References

 Sysoev, A. & Bouchet, P., 2001. New and uncommon turriform gastropods (Gastropoda: Conoidea) from the south-west Pacific. Mémoires du Muséum national d'Histoire naturelle 185: 271-320

External links
 MNHN: holotype
 
 Gastropods.com: Inquisitor hormophorus

hormophorus
Gastropods described in 2001